"Lonely Nights" is a song written by Keith Stegall and Stewart Harris, and recorded by American country music artist Mickey Gilley.  It was released in September 1981 as the second single from the album You Don't Know Me.  The song was Gilley's thirteenth number one country hit.  The single stayed at number one for one week and stayed a total of thirteen weeks on the country chart.

Charts

Weekly charts

Year-end charts

References 

1981 singles
1981 songs
Mickey Gilley songs
Songs written by Keith Stegall
Song recordings produced by Jim Ed Norman
Epic Records singles
Songs written by Stewart Harris